"Tin Omen" is a single by the band Skinny Puppy, taken from their 1989 album Rabies. The song name is a reference to the 1989 Tiananmen Square protests and massacre. The song also refers to the My Lai massacre of 1968 and the Kent State shootings of 1970.

Ministry frontman Al Jourgensen (credited as both Alien Jourgensen and Hypo Luxa) performed guitar and backing vocals for the song. The band's longtime producer Dave "Rave" Ogilvie also contributed additional backing vocals.

Track listing

Personnel
All credits adapted from liner notes.

Skinny Puppy
Nivek Ogre – vocals
cEvin Key – synthesizers, programming, production, engineering
Dwayne Goettel – synthesizers, programming, production, engineering

Additional personnel
Al Jourgensen – production, engineering, mixing (1, 2), bass, guitar, backing vocals
Dave Ogilvie – production, engineering, mixing (2, 3, 4)
Steven R. Gilmore – design, typography
Greg Sykes – typography
Marc Ramaer – mixing (1, 2)

References

1989 singles
Kent State shootings
Skinny Puppy songs
1989 Tiananmen Square protests and massacre
Nettwerk Records singles
Capitol Records singles
EMI Records singles
Works about gun politics in the United States
1989 songs
Songs written by cEvin Key
Songs written by Nivek Ogre
Songs written by Dwayne Goettel
Songs about the media